Atmaram or Atma Ram may refer to:
 Atma Ram (politician), Afghan minister of Hindu religious background in the 19th century
 Atma Ram (director) (1930–1994), Hindi film and TV director
 Atma Ram (scientist) (1908–1983), Indian scientist
 Atmaram (film), a 1979 film with Indian actor Shatrughan Sinha
 A nickname for Vijayanandsuri (1821–1896), Jain religious leader